91st Street is a proposed station along the Northern Branch Corridor Project extension of Hudson-Bergen Light Rail in the Babbitt Section of North Bergen, New Jersey.

The station site is located along the Northern Branch (CSX) south of the Edgewater Branch (NYSW) at the city line with Fairview west of U.S. Route 1/9 (Tonnelle Avenue). It is designed to have two side platforms and small parking area for 32 vehicles.

Erie Railroad's Northern Branch and the New York, Susquehanna, and Western (NYSW) maintained a minor station at Babitt   nearby 83rd Street in North Bergen. After diverging the Northern Branch crossed under the West Shore Railroad and proceeded to next station stop at Railroad Avenue in Fairview. The new station at 91st Street is located between the two historical stations.

As of 2021 a study for the Passaic–Bergen–Hudson Transit Project is reviewing the reintroduction of passenger service on a portion of the NYSW right-of-way in Passaic, Bergen, and Hudson counties. A potential route would use the Edgewater Branch right-of-way to connect to the HBLR just north of the 91st Street station, including a station stop there.

See also
Northern Branch (NJ Transit)
NYSW (passenger 1939-1966) map
Passaic-Bergen-Hudson Transit map

References

Proposed NJ Transit rail stations
Hudson-Bergen Light Rail stations
North Bergen, New Jersey